New Moscow is an unincorporated community in Virginia Township of Coshocton County, Ohio, United States.

History
New Moscow had a start when a store was established there. The community was laid out in 1835. A post office called New Moscow opened in 1851, and remained in operation until 1905.

References

Populated places in Coshocton County, Ohio